Sinclair Island is an island over  long, lying  northeast of Reeve Island in the Wauwermans Islands, in the Wilhelm Archipelago. First mapped by the Argentines in 1950. The toponym replaces the provisional name "Alberto" and was approved by the Geographic Coordinating Committee (Argentina) in 1956. It memorializes Argentine naval hero Captain Enrique Sinclair (1805–1904). Born in New York City, U.S., he emigrated while very young to the Rio de la Plata, joined the Argentine navy and fought at the side of Admiral William Brown in the war with Brazil.

See also 
 List of Antarctic and sub-Antarctic islands

Islands of the Wilhelm Archipelago